Chestnut Ridge is an unincorporated community in Ste. Genevieve County, in the U.S. state of Missouri.

History
A post office called Chestnut Ridge was established in 1860, and remained in operation until 1877. The community was named for the chestnut timber at a nearby ridge.

References

Unincorporated communities in Ste. Genevieve County, Missouri
Unincorporated communities in Missouri